Hans-Joachim Stuck (born 1 January 1951), nicknamed "Strietzel", is a German racing driver who has competed in Formula One and many other categories. He is the son of pre-World War II racing driver Hans Stuck

Life and career
He was born in Garmisch-Partenkirchen in Bavaria, and is the son of Christa Thielmann and the legendary 1930s Auto Union Grand Prix driver Hans Stuck. As a young boy, his father taught him driving on the Nürburgring. In 1969 he started his first ever motor race at the Nordschleife. Speaking about that day he said, "Getting to the grid was extremely exciting. All of a sudden, my wishes to become a racer came true. I just wanted to start the race and give everybody hell!" The following year, at just 19 years of age, he won his first 24 hours race at the wheel of a BMW 2002ti. He won there again in 1998 and 2004, too, each time with a BMW touring car.

In 1972, Stuck teamed up with Jochen Mass to drive a Ford Capri RS2600 to victory at the Spa 24 Hours endurance race in Belgium. His campaigns racing the BMW 3.0 CSL "Batmobile" were very successful in 1974 and 1975, in the German DRM as well as in the USA together with Ronnie Peterson. Later in the 1970s he raced the turbo-charged BMW 320i.After some success in Formula 2 with a March-BMW, he also entered F1 with March. Overall, Stuck participated in 81 Grands Prix, debuting on 13 January 1974. He achieved two podiums and scored 29 championship points. Incidentally, Stuck was the first driver to be born after the inaugural Grand Prix in 1950. Stuck was quite successful at Brabham-Alfa in 1977, leading the 1977 United States Grand Prix at Watkins Glen in the rain, but was replaced by Niki Lauda for 1978. Stuck missed an opportunity to join Williams F1 just before this team became successful.
Leaving F1 at that time probably spared him bad injuries to the leg, as suffered by Ronnie Peterson, Clay Regazzoni, Marc Surer and others.

Stuck continued racing touring and sports cars all over the world, winning the 24 Hours of Le Mans twice with a Porsche 962. Stuck says the 962 is the favourite racecar he has driven during his career, describing it as having the "perfect combination of power and downforce" and saying that he had "never sat in such a high-tech racing car as the Porsche 962C with the PDK semi-automatic transmission".

In the 1990s he tasted touring car success, winning the DTM Championship in 1990 with Audi, before returning to Porsche until the 24 Hours of Le Mans in 1998. He resumed an official role with BMW after that. In 2006, Stuck raced in the inaugural season of the Grand Prix Masters formula for retired Formula One drivers after scoring 6th in the first race event at the Kyalami circuit in South Africa on 11–13 November 2005.

January 2008 saw Stuck began his current position with Volkswagen Motorsport. This role has also seen him use his experience to help refine road cars, including the new Golf VI GTI.

Stuck announced the end of his active career as a race driver after 43 years after the 2011 Nürburgring 24 Hours, in which he participated with a Reiter Engineering Lamborghini Gallardo LP600+ GT3 together with Dennis Rostek and his sons Ferdinand Stuck and Johannes Stuck. Team Stuck³ finished 15th overall following gearbox problems.

In April 2012, Stuck was appointed President of the German Motorsport Association (Deutscher Motor Sport Bund).

Racing record

Career summary

‡ Graded drivers not eligible for European Formula Two Championship points.
† As Stuck was a guest driver, he was ineligible for championship points.

Complete 24 Hours of Nürburgring results

Complete European Formula Two Championship results
(key) (Races in bold indicate pole position; races in italics indicate fastest lap)

 Graded drivers not eligible for  European Formula Two Championship points

Complete World Sportscar Championship results
(key) (Races in bold indicate pole position) (Races in italics indicate fastest lap)

Footnotes

Complete 24 Hours of Le Mans results

Complete Formula One World Championship results
(key) (Races in bold indicate pole position; races in italics indicate fastest lap)

Complete British Saloon Car Championship results
(key) (Races in bold indicate pole position – 1983 in class) (Races in italics indicate fastest lap – 1 point awarded 1983 all races, 1983 in class)

Complete Deutsche Tourenwagen Meisterschaft results
(key) (Races in bold indicate pole position) (Races in italics indicate fastest lap)

Complete Super Tourenwagen Cup results
(key) (Races in bold indicate pole position) (Races in italics indicate fastest lap)

Complete International Touring Car Championship results
(key) (Races in bold indicate pole position) (Races in italics indicate fastest lap)

† — Retired, but was classified as he completed 90% of the winner's race distance.

Complete Grand Prix Masters results
(key) Races in bold indicate pole position, races in italics indicate fastest lap.

References

External links

 Official website 

1951 births
Living people
German racing drivers
German Formula One drivers
Sportspeople from Garmisch-Partenkirchen
Racing drivers from Bavaria
European Formula Two Championship drivers
International Race of Champions drivers
March Formula One drivers
Brabham Formula One drivers
Shadow Formula One drivers
ATS Wheels Formula One drivers
Grand Prix Masters drivers
American Le Mans Series drivers
Trans-Am Series drivers
British Touring Car Championship drivers
24 Hours of Le Mans drivers
24 Hours of Le Mans winning drivers
Deutsche Tourenwagen Masters drivers
Deutsche Tourenwagen Masters champions
World Sportscar Championship drivers
24 Hours of Spa drivers
12 Hours of Sebring drivers
24 Hours of Daytona drivers
Team Joest drivers
Team Rosberg drivers
Schnitzer Motorsport drivers
Porsche Motorsports drivers
Audi Sport drivers
BMW M drivers
Phoenix Racing drivers
Nürburgring 24 Hours drivers
24H Series drivers
Volkswagen Motorsport drivers